Ashoka is a 2008 Indian Tamil-language action thriller film written and directed by NRI, Prem Menon, who also stars in the lead role with Raghuvaran and Anandaraj in supporting roles. The film revolves around the life of a protector, who guards the Prime Minister of India. The film was produced by Prem's wife Indira under Lotus Film Company.

Plot
Prem Menon plays a Black Cat commando chief Ashoka looking after the security of the Prime Minister of the country. The film begins with Ashoka barely managing to save the life of the PM at the Coimbatore airport from a terrorist ambush.

Ashoka saves the PM, as the doctor later says, "The PM has survived, as he has his heart on the right side which is a rare phenomenon!" The rest of the film is about how Ashoka foils more terrorist attempts on the PM's life as he is recovering at the hospital.

Cast
Prem Menon as Ashoka
Anushree
Raghuvaran
Anandaraj
Uma Padmanabhan
Rajeev
Livingston
Naveen

Production
The film began production in June 2004, and was made over four years. The film featured no songs or a separate comedy track, and won media recognition for being a rare Tamil film during the period to have neither of those elements.

Reception
Sify wrote, "Unfortunately Ashoka is not a great experience and drags." Indiaglitz wrote, "Prem deserves to be appreciated for his courage and hard work to come out with a thriller with a racy script, without no songs and other commercial ingredients. Prem could have made the film a better fare had he avoided the glaring loopholes and the sentimental sequences".

References

2008 films
2000s Tamil-language films
Indian action thriller films
Cultural depictions of prime ministers of India
2008 action thriller films